Hans Suess, known as Hans von Kulmbach, was a German artist. He was born around 1480 in Kulmbach, Franconia and died prior to 3 December 1522 in Nuremberg. Hans von Kulmbach was the artist who created the Kraków St John's Altar.

Life

Kulmbach probably arrived in Nuremberg around 1505. He received instruction by Jacopo de' Barbari, who for a time worked in Nuremberg. Von Kulmbach then apprenticed with Albrecht Dürer and after Dürer retired from painting altarpieces in 1510 Kulmbach took over most of his commissions. Kulmbach had his own workshop in Nuremberg and at times worked in Kraków. He also created artworks for emperor Maximilian I and for Margrave Casimir Hohenzollern von Brandenburg-Kulmbach. His best works were stained-glass windows in churches, such as the Maximilian stained-glass, Margrave stained-glass at St. Sebald in Nuremberg, the Welser stained-glass at the Frauenkirche and the Nikolaus altar at Lorenzkirche. In 1511 he finished the St. Mary's altar at Skałka in Kraków. The Catherine and St. John's altar also in Kraków, are among his best works.

Gallery

See also
 History of Kraków

References

 Hans von Kulmbach biography at getty.edu
 artcyclopedia.com

External links

1480s births
1528 deaths
16th-century German painters
German male painters
People from Kulmbach
Artists from Nuremberg
Stained glass artists and manufacturers
German Roman Catholics